In astronomical spectroscopy, the Gunn–Peterson trough is a feature of the spectra of quasars due to the presence of neutral hydrogen in the Intergalactic medium (IGM). The trough is characterized by suppression of electromagnetic emission from the quasar at wavelengths less than that of the Lyman-alpha line at the redshift of the emitted light. This effect was originally predicted in 1965 by James E. Gunn and Bruce Peterson.

First detection

For over three decades after the prediction, no objects had been found distant enough to show the Gunn–Peterson trough. It was not until 2001, with the discovery of a quasar with a redshift z = 6.28 by Robert Becker and others using data from the Sloan Digital Sky Survey, that a Gunn–Peterson trough was finally observed. The article also included quasars at redshifts of z = 5.82 and z = 5.99, and, while each of these exhibited absorption at wavelengths on the blue side of the Lyman-alpha transition, there were numerous spikes in flux as well. The flux of the quasar at z = 6.28, however, was effectively zero beyond the Lyman-alpha limit, meaning that the neutral hydrogen fraction in the IGM must have been larger than ~10−3.

Evidence for reionization

The discovery of the trough in a z = 6.28 quasar, and the absence of the trough in quasars detected at redshifts just below z = 6 presented strong evidence for the hydrogen in the universe having undergone a transition from neutral to ionized around z = 6. After recombination, the universe was expected to be neutral, until the first objects in the universe started emitting light and energy which would reionize the surrounding IGM. However, as the scattering cross section of photons with energies near that of the Lyman-alpha limit with neutral hydrogen is very high, even a small fraction of neutral hydrogen will make the optical depth of the IGM high enough to cause the suppression of emission observed. Despite the fact that the ratio of neutral hydrogen to ionized hydrogen may not have been particularly high, the low flux observed past the Lyman-alpha limit indicates that the universe was in the final stages of reionization.

Following the first release of data from the WMAP spacecraft in 2003, the determination by Becker that the end of reionization occurred at z ≈ 6 appeared to conflict with estimates made from the WMAP measurement of the electron column density. However, the WMAP III data released in 2006 now seems to be in much better agreement with the limits on reionization placed by observation of the Gunn–Peterson trough.

See also

 Lyman-alpha forest

References

Space plasmas
Astrophysics
Physical cosmology